Cheung Po is a village in Pat Heung, Yuen Long District, Hong Kong.

Administration
Cheung Po is a recognized village under the New Territories Small House Policy.

Population
The inhabitants of Cheung Po are all Hakkas, composed of five clans of four surnames: two clans surnamed Tang and the others surnamed Tsang, Cheung and Wong. Most of their ancestors migrated from other parts of Hong Kong between the 1740s and the 1770s.

Features
The St. John's Chapel in Cheung Po was built in 1928. In addition to being used for religious services, it also served as an elementary school for children from Cheung Po and nearby villages. The school closed down in 1951 and the chapel was vacated in the 1980s. The chapel is a Grade II historic Building.

Other old buildings in the village include Houses Nos. 3–6, Houses Nos. 9–11, Houses Nos. 15-16 and a Kwan Tai Temple.

References

External links

 Delineation of area of existing village Cheung Po Tsuen (Pat Heung) for election of resident representative (2019 to 2022)
 Antiquities Advisory Board. Pictures of St. John's Chapel
 Pictures of Cheung Po
 Pictures of the Kwan Tai Temple

Villages in Yuen Long District, Hong Kong
Pat Heung